Donald's Better Self is a 1938 Disney cartoon featuring Donald Duck. This 8 minute short premiered in March 1938, and it was distributed by RKO Radio Pictures.

Plot
Donald is fast asleep in his bed. As he turns in his sleep, his Conscience takes a form of its own beside him. She looks exactly like Donald, but wears a white robe and a golden halo. She also has a kinder and gentler voice than Donald. The Conscience tries to get Donald up and out of bed so he won't be late for school, but Donald's Anti-Conscience appears to keep Donald in bed. He has a different voice than Donald's and has a devil form with horns. He easily convinces Donald to stay in bed, but the Conscience wins out and walks with Donald to school.

Along the way, Donald is tempted by the Anti-Conscience to skip out on school and go fishing instead. At the fishing hole, the Anti-Conscience pressures him to smoke a pipe, which causes him to get sick. Soon the Conscience arrives looking for Donald. She finds him sick, and she gets angry at the Anti-Conscience for Donald's misfortune. The Anti-Conscience soon realizes he's in trouble when he sees the Conscience behind him. "YOU! This is all your fault!" says the Conscience to the Anti-Conscience, who nervously convinces the Conscience not to hurt him. The Conscience refuses, but after the Anti-Conscience deliberately tricks her, proceeds to fight the Anti-Conscience to teach him a lesson. Donald finally learns to do the right thing and go to school rather than give in to temptation.

Voice cast
 Donald Duck: Clarence Nash
 Donald's Angel: Thelma Boardman
 Donald's Devil: Don Brodie

Home media
The short was released on May 18, 2004, on Walt Disney Treasures: The Chronological Donald, Volume One: 1934-1941.

In other media
This short was one of the many featured in Donald Duck's 50th Birthday, however the short is shown in Japanese to illustrate Donald's global appeal.
A clip of this cartoon can be seen in Flubber.
This cartoon was shown in the 1960 Walt Disney Presents episode, This is Your Life, Donald Duck.

Legacy
Some elements from the short provided the basis for Donald's Decision.

References

External links

1930s color films
Donald Duck short films
1930s Disney animated short films
1938 short films
1938 animated films
Films directed by Jack King
Films produced by Walt Disney
Films scored by Oliver Wallace
The Devil in film
Films about angels
Films with screenplays by Carl Barks
1930s American films
American comedy short films
American animated short films
RKO Pictures short films
RKO Pictures animated short films
Films about ducks
Animated films about birds